Wolfgang Bartels (13 August 1903 – 13 December 1975) was a German politician of the Christian Democratic Union (CDU) and former member of the German Bundestag.

Life 
From 1953 to 1956 he was deputy district chairman of the CDU in Bochum and chairman of the CDU economic committee in the city.

Bartels was a city councillor in Bochum for many years. From 1957 to 1961 he was a member of the German Bundestag.

Literature

References

1903 births
1975 deaths
Members of the Bundestag for North Rhine-Westphalia
Members of the Bundestag 1957–1961
Members of the Bundestag for the Christian Democratic Union of Germany